Reading was a parliamentary borough, and later a borough constituency, represented in the House of Commons of the Parliament of the United Kingdom. It comprised the town of Reading in the county of Berkshire.

From 1295, as a parliamentary borough, Reading elected two members of parliament (MPs). Under the Redistribution of Seats Act 1885,this representation was reduced to a single MP. The constituency was abolished in 1950, re-created in 1955, and finally abolished in 1974.

History
Reading was one of the boroughs summoned to send members to the Model Parliament. The boundaries (encompassing the whole of one parish and parts of two others) were effectively unchanged from 1295 to 1918. In 1831, the population of the borough was 15,935, and contained 3,307 houses.

The right to vote was exercised by all inhabitants paying scot and lot, a relatively wide franchise for the period, and almost 2,000 votes were cast at the general election of 1826. Despite this high electorate, the corporation of the town was generally considered in practice to control elections to a large extent. In the second half of the 18th century, Reading was notoriously one of the most corrupt constituencies in England, bribery being both routine and expensive: Namier quotes the accounts kept for Prime Minister Newcastle of the 1754 election, which note that John Dodd, the government's candidate there, had already received £1000 and was promised £500 or £600 more to help him win the seat. (Dodd lost by one vote, but had the result overturned on petition by a partisan vote in the House of Commons, and Newcastle's accounts show a continuing trickle of funds to him to nurse the constituency over the next few years.) A few years later, the nomination to one of Reading's seats was advertised for sale in a London newspaper, though Reading was not mentioned by name and no price was specified; the newspaper's printers were charged by the Commons with a breach of privilege, but the sale of seats remained legal if frowned-upon until 1809.

The Great Reform Act left Reading's representation and boundaries unchanged, and the reformed franchise far from increasing its electorate seems to have reduced it: it was estimated that there were 1,250 voters in 1831, but only 1,001 were registered for the first post-Reform election, that of 1832.

The Redistribution of Seats Act 1885, coming into effect at the 1885 general election, reduced the representation of the parliamentary borough to a single MP. The single-member Reading constituency continued to exist until it was split in 1950 into the separate constituencies of Reading North and Reading South. These two constituencies were merged back into a single Reading constituency in 1955, but again split apart in 1974; despite its name, the 1955 constituency contained only ten wards of the County Borough of Reading. Today the area formerly covered by the Reading constituency is within the constituencies of Reading East and Reading West.

Boundaries and boundary changes 

1885–1918: The existing Parliamentary borough, and the area between the boundary of the Parliamentary borough and a boundary line drawn from the point at which the Reading and Reigate Railway crossed the boundary of the Parliamentary borough at the River Kennet, eastward along the  Railway until it crossed Culver Lane, then westward along the centre of Culver Lane as far as the centre of Wokingham Road, then southward along the centre of Wokingham Road as far as the centre of Crescent Road, then westward along the centre of Crescent Road as far as the centre of Eastern Avenue, then southward along the centre of Eastern Avenue as far as the centre of Upper Redlands Road, then westward along the centre of Upper Redlands Road as far as the centre of Alexandra Road, then south and west along the centre of Junction Road to the centre of Christchurch Road, then along the centre of Christchurch Road until the line reached the boundary of the existing Parliamentary borough.

1918–1950: The County Borough of Reading.

Boundaries extended to the south and west (gained from the Newbury and Wokingham Divisions of Berkshire), and to the north of the River Thames with the annexation of the Urban District of Caversham (part of the Henley Division of Oxfordshire) by Reading County Borough.

For the 1950 general election, Reading was abolished as a single-member Parliamentary Borough and split between the two new Borough Constituencies of Reading North and Reading South.

1955–1974: For the 1955 general election, Reading was re-established as Borough Constituency, replacing Reading North and Reading South and comprising the County Borough of Reading wards of Abbey, Battle, Castle, Caversham East, Caversham West, Church, Katesgrove, Minster, Redlands, Victoria, West. The East and Tilehurst wards were respectively included in the Wokingham and Newbury constituencies.

From the 1964 general election, following a revision to the County Borough wards, the constituency comprised the wards of Abbey, Battle, Castle, Caversham, Christchurch, Katesgrove, Minster, Redlands, Thames, and Whitley, resulting in minor changes.

The constituency was abolished once again for the 1974 general election.  Christchurch, Redlands and Whitley wards were included in the re-established County Constituency of Reading South, with remaining wards being included in the re-established Borough Constituency of Reading North.

Members of Parliament

1295–1660
 Constituency created 1295

1640–1885

1885–1950

1955–1974

Elections

Elections in the 1830s

Elections in the 1840s

 
 

 
 

 
 
 

 

 

Talfourd resigned after being appointed a judge of the Court of Common Pleas, causing a by-election.

Elections in the 1850s

 
 
 

 

Keating was appointed Solicitor General for England and Wales, requiring a by-election.

 
 

Keating was appointed Solicitor General for England and Wales, requiring a by-election.

Elections in the 1860s
Keating resigned after being appointed a Judge of the Court of Common Pleas, causing a by-election.

 
 

Pigott resigned after being appointed Lieutenant Governor of the Isle of Man, causing a by-election.

 
 

Pigott resigned after being appointed a Judge of the Court of the Exchequer, causing a by-election.

 
 
 

Shaw-Lefevre was appointed a Civil Lord of the Admiralty, requiring a by-election.

Elections in the 1870s

 

 

 

Goldsmid's death caused a by-election.

Elections in the 1880s

 

Lefevre was appointed First Commissioner of Works and Public Buildings, requiring a by-election.

Elections in the 1890s

Murdoch's death caused a by-election.

Elections in the 1900s

Elections in the 1910s

Isaacs is appointed Solicitor General of England and Wales, requiring a by-election.

Issacs is appointed Lord Chief Justice of England and is elevated to the peerage as Lord Reading, requiring a by-election.

A General Election was due to take place by the end of 1915. By the summer of 1914, the following candidates had been adopted to contest that election. Due to the outbreak of war, the election never took place.
Unionist Party: Leslie Orme Wilson
Liberal Party: Henry Norman Spalding
British Socialist Party: Joseph George Butler

Elections in the 1920s

Elections in the 1930s 

The Liberal Party candidate, Rosalie Glynn Grylls withdrew at close of nominations

General Election 1939–40:
Another General Election was required to take place before the end of 1940. The political parties had been making preparations for an election to take place and by the Autumn of 1939, the following candidates had been selected; 
Conservative: Alfred Howitt
Labour: Margaret Bondfield

Elections in the 1940s

Elections in the 1950s

Elections in the 1960s

Elections in the 1970s

References

General 
 J Holladay Philbin, Parliamentary Representation 1832 – England and Wales (New Haven: Yale University Press, 1965)
 Edward Porritt and Annie G Porritt, The Unreformed House of Commons (Cambridge University Press, 1903)

Specific

See also 
 List of parliamentary constituencies in Berkshire

Parliamentary constituencies in Berkshire (historic)
Politics of Reading, Berkshire
Constituencies of the Parliament of the United Kingdom established in 1295
Constituencies of the Parliament of the United Kingdom disestablished in 1950
Constituencies of the Parliament of the United Kingdom established in 1955
Constituencies of the Parliament of the United Kingdom disestablished in 1974